Martin O'Sullivan (1891 – 20 January 1956) was an Irish Labour Party politician.

He was born in 1891 in Ennistymon, County Clare. He was educated locally, and joined the Midland Great Western Railway as a clerk and worked in Sligo and Cavan before his appointment as station master at Recess, County Galway. After the amalgamation of the Midland Great Western and Great Southern railways, he was transferred to Dublin and later became chief paymaster at Inchicore railway works for Great Southern and Western Railway.

He was prominent in the trade union movement, and was secretary and chairman of the Irish Council of Railway Clerks Association, chairman of the Dublin Council of Trade Unions, and a member of the national executive of the Irish Trades Union Congress.

In 1930, he was elected to Dublin Corporation, and served until 1950. He was elected to Dáil Éireann as a Labour Party Teachta Dála (TD) for the Dublin North-West constituency at the 1943 general election. He was re-elected at the 1944 and 1948 general elections. He lost his seat at the 1951 general election. He served as Lord Mayor of Dublin from 1943 to 1945, the first member of the Labour Party to hold the position.

References

 

1891 births
1956 deaths
Labour Party (Ireland) TDs
Members of the 11th Dáil
Members of the 12th Dáil
Members of the 13th Dáil
Politicians from County Clare
Lord Mayors of Dublin